Andreas Dudith, also András Dudith de Horahovicza (February 5, 1533 in Buda - February 22, 1589 in Wrocław), was a Hungarian nobleman of Croatian and Italian origin, bishop, humanist and diplomat in the Kingdom of Hungary.

Dudith was born in Buda, capital city of the Kingdom of Hungary to a Hungarian noble family with Croatian origins. His father, Jeromos Dudits, was a Croatian and his mother was an Italian. He studied in Wrocław, Italy, Vienna, Brussels and Paris.

In 1560 King Ferdinand I appointed him bishop of Knin, Croatia. He then participated in the Council of Trent (1545–1563) where, to comply with the wish of Ferdinand, he urged that the Chalice be given to the laity. Being appointed bishop of Pécs, Dudith went to Poland in 1565 as ambassador of Maximilian, where he married, and resigned his see, becoming an adherent of Protestantism. In Poland he began to sympathize with Socinian Anti-trinitarianism (the so-called Ecclesia Minor). Although he never declared himself officially a Unitarian, some researchers label him as an Anti-trinitarian thinker.

After the election of Stephen Báthory as king of Poland, Dudith left Kraków and went to Wrocław and later to Moravia, where he supported the Bohemian Brothers.

Dudith maintained a correspondence with famous Anti-trinitarians such as Giorgio Blandrata, Jacob Paleologus and Fausto Sozzini. Mihály Balázs, an expert on Central-European Anti-trinitarianism, affirms that Paleologus in Kraków lived in Dudith's house and left there to go to  Transylvania. The theories of Blandrata, Sozzini and Ferenc Dávid had a great influence on him. Nevertheless he always remained an Erasmian humanist, who condemned religious intolerance whether from Protestants or Catholics.

Dudith died in 1589 in Wrocław and was buried in the Saint-Elizabeth Lutheran Church.

References

Further reading
 Almási, Gábor (2009), Johannes Sambucus (1531–1584), Andreas Dudith (1533–1589), and the Republic of Letters in East Central Europe, Leiden: Brill, .
 Balsem, A. C. (2007), "Books from the Library of Andreas Dudith (1533-89) in the library of Isaac Vossius," in: Books on the Move. Tracking Copies Through Collections and the Book Trade, edited by Robin Myers, Michael Harris, Giles Mandelbrote. London & New Castle, DE: Oak Knoll Press & the British Library, pp. 69–86.
 Costil, Pierre (1935), André Dudith Humaniste Hongrois 1533–1589: Sa Vie, son Oeuvre et ses Manuscrits Grecs, Paris: Société D'édition “Les Belles Lettres.”
 Gillet, J. F. A. (1860–61), Crato von Crafftheim und seine Freunde, 2 vols. Frankfurt: H. L. Brönner.
 Ilić, Luka (2015),  Andreas Dudith und sein reformiertes Netzwerk in Breslau am Ende des 16. Jahrhunderts, in: Die Reformierten in Schlesien. Vom 16. Jahrhundert bis zur Altpreußischen Union von 1817 [VIEG Beiheft 106], Göttingen: Vandenhoeck & Ruprecht, pp. 53–63.
 Jedin, Hubert (1912-), “André Dudith,” in Dictionnaire d’histoire et de géographie ecclésiastiques, Paris, vol. 14, 988–990.

External links
 Epitaph of Andreas Dudith at the St. Elisabeth Church in Wroclaw
 De Cometis Dissertationes Novae Clariss. Virorum Thom. Erasti, Andr. Dudithij, Marc. Squarcialupi, Symon. Grynaei. Basileae 1580, Online-Edition of the Sächsische Landesbibliothek - Staats- und Universitätsbibliothek Dresden
 Andrija Dudić, bishop of Knin, Csanád and Pécs, in the list of bishops of Szeged-Csanád

1533 births
1589 deaths
Croatian nobility
Roman Catholic bishops in Croatia
16th-century Roman Catholic bishops in Hungary
Hungarian nobility
People from Buda
Bishops of Pécs